Deve Gowda ministry was the Council of Ministers in Karnataka, a state in South India headed by H. D. Deve Gowda that was formed after the 1994 Karnataka elections.

In the government headed by H. D. Deve Gowda, the chief minister was from the Indian National Congress party. Apart from the chief minister, there were deputy chief minister and other ministers in the government.

Tenure of the government 
In 1994, Janata Dal emerged victorious and H. D. Deve Gowda was elected as leader of the Party, hence sworn in as Chief Minister of Karnataka and J. H. Patel was picked as Deputy Chief Minister. The ministry was dissolved when H. D. Deve Gowda became the Prime Minister of India after Janata Dal forged United Front alliance with INC and 11 other parties

Council of Ministers

Chief Minister and deputy Chief Minister

Cabinet Ministers

Minister of State

If the office of a Minister is vacant for any length of time, it automatically comes under the charge of the Chief Minister.

See also 

 Karnataka Legislative Assembly

References

External links 

 Council of Ministers 

Cabinets established in 1994
1994 establishments in Karnataka
Deve Gowda
1996 disestablishments in India
Cabinets disestablished in 1996
1994 in Indian politics
Janata Dal state ministries